Marko Dolenc (born 27 September 1972) is a Slovenian biathlete. He competed in the men's 20 km individual event at the 2002 Winter Olympics.

References

1972 births
Living people
Slovenian male biathletes
Olympic biathletes of Slovenia
Biathletes at the 2002 Winter Olympics
Sportspeople from Ljubljana